Schneverdingen (Low Saxon Snevern) is a city in the northern part of the district of Heidekreis, in Lower Saxony, Germany. It is located in the area known as Lüneburg Heath.

Geography

Location

History
Schneverdingen belonged to the Prince-Bishopric of Verden, established in 1180. In 1648 the Prince-Bishopric was transformed into the Principality of Verden, which was first ruled in personal union by the Swedish Crown - interrupted by a Danish occupation (1712–1715) - and from 1715 on by the Hanoverian Crown. The Kingdom of Hanover incorporated the Principality in a real union and the Princely territory, including Schneverdingen, became part of the new Stade Region, established in 1823.

Government

Town twinning

Schneverdingen is twinned with:
 Barlinek, Poland
 Eksjö, Sweden

Places of interest
 Höpen Airfield
 Reinsehlen Camp
 Heidegarten
 Pietzmoor

References

External links

 Municipal website

Heidekreis